The following hills and mountains are named South Table Mountain:
South Table Mountain (California) in Butte County
South Table Mountain (Colorado) in Jefferson County